Elling is a village with a population of 1,168 (1 January 2022) in the Vendsyssel region, North Jutland, Denmark, located in Elling Parish outside of Frederikshavn.

Nearby is Elling Å, a stream whose estuary hosts nearly extinct marsh fritillary butterflies.

Its 13th-century church is especially notable.

Notable people 
 Connie Nielsen (born 1965 in Frederikshavn) actress, was brought up in the town 
 Lotte Kiærskou (born 1975 in Frederikshavn)  team handball player, won two team gold medals in the 2000 and 2004 Summer Olympics; she grew up in the town.

References

Villages in Denmark
Frederikshavn Municipality